T2 (born Tafadzwa Tawonezvi) (born May 1988) is an English record producer from Leeds, West Yorkshire, England. His single "Heartbroken", featuring Jodie Aysha, hit No. 2 on the UK Singles Chart and was certified platinum by the BPI in 2022. T2 rewrote the lyrics of the tune late in 2007, in support of Ricky Hatton's boxing match against Floyd Mayweather.

In 2008, T2 teamed up with Addictive to release "Gonna Be Mine".

He has also worked with Dizzee Rascal, Pixie Lott, Craig David, Addictive, Gia and Rebecca Ferguson.

Discography

Singles and EPs
2007: The Monster Dubz EP
2007: "Heartbroken" (T2 feat. Jodie Aysha) - No. 2 UK
2008: "Gonna Be Mine" (T2 feat. Addictive) - No. 47 UK
2008: "Butterflies"
2009: "Come Over" (T2 feat. Michelle Escoffery)
2012: "Nothing's Real But Love" (Rebecca Ferguson - T2 Mix)
2017: "Piece of Me" (T2 feat. GIA)
2018 :"Emotions" (T2 feat. Morgan Munroe)

References

External links
T2 at MySpace

1988 births
Living people
English record producers
Bassline musicians
Black British DJs
Musicians from Leeds
Electronic dance music DJs